Wielowieś  is a village in the administrative district of Gmina Sulęcin, within Sulęcin County, Lubusz Voivodeship, in western Poland.

The village has a population of 231.

References

Villages in Sulęcin County